Dasarahalli is a town and a city municipal council in Bangalore Urban district  in the state of Karnataka, India

Demographics 
 India census, Dasarahalli had a population of 263,636. Males constitute 54% of the population and females 46%. Dasarahalli has an average literacy rate of 72%, higher than the national average of 59.5%: male literacy is 77% and, female literacy is 66%. In Dasarahalli, 12% of the population is under 6 years of age.

T Dasarahalli (Tumkur road Dasarahalli) or Peenya Dasarahalli was a former City Municipal Council. But, now it is officially merged to Bruhat Bangalore Mahanagara Palike. T Dasarahalli is also an Assembly Constituency after delimitation of Assembly constituencies. Manjunath from JDS is now representing Dasarahalli constituency.

Dasarahalli is strategically located as it is on National Highway 4. Zip code of T.Dasarahalli is 560057.

References

External links
Town website

Neighbourhoods in Bangalore
Cities and towns in Bangalore Rural district